In railway terminology, track gauge indicates the distance between the inside edges of the running rails.

In Britain, standard gauge is used for all main line routes and the majority of urban light rail. Narrow gauge railways were constructed mainly where there was a need for tighter curves, smaller structure gauges, and lighter rails, as they could be less costly to build, equip and operate than standard gauge railways (particularly in mountainous or difficult terrain).

Narrow gauge railways in Britain used various gauges.  was relatively uncommon; in his book Railway Adventure, L. T. C. Rolt states that apart from the Talyllyn, the only public railways to use the gauge were the Corris and Campbeltown and Machrihanish railways. However there were several private railways, including mine and quarry railways, which used the gauge.

List of 2 ft 3 in gauge railways
This list, whilst not necessarily complete, details all railways that are believed to have used  gauge at some point during their existence.

Similar gauges
No railways of an identical gauge are known outside Britain, though lines of  gauge are known in Latvia and Romania and several Cuban sugar cane railways.

Other British railways of similar, but not identical, gauge were:
 Snailbeach District Railways,  gauge
 Welbeck Colliery, Nottinghamshire,  gauge, which closed in 2010.
 Glyn Valley Tramway,  gauge

See also
British narrow-gauge railways

Notes

References